Jelačić is a surname. Notable people with the surname include:

 House of Jelačić, Croatian noble family
 Aleksije Jelačić (1892–1941), Serbian historian of Croatian descent
 Franjo Jelačić (1746–1810), Croatian nobleman
 Josip Jelačić (1801–1859), Croatian nobleman and general

See also 
 Jelačići (disambiguation)

Croatian surnames
Serbian surnames